The Palazzo Tiepolo is a Renaissance-style palace located between the Palazzo Soranzo Pisani and the Palazzo Pisani Moretta on the Grand Canal, in the Sestieri of San Polo, Venice, Italy.

History
The palace was commissioned in the second half of the 16th century at the site of an older palace by the aristocratic Tiepolo family. The facade was once frescoed by Andrea Schiavone; traces remain. The entry was frescoed by Jacopo Guarana and the interiors are decorated with polychrome stucco.

Bibliography

References

Tiepolo
Tiepolo
Renaissance architecture in Venice
Houses completed in the 16th century